is a metro station on the Osaka Metro Tanimachi Line located in Hirano-ku, Osaka, Japan.

Layout

The station has an island platform serving 2 tracks underground.

Surroundings
Daiei
Nagayoshi Park
Nagahara Ruins

Deto Bus Terminal
Osaka City Bus
Bus stop 1
Route 61A for Nagayoshi Shogakko-mae and Nagayoshi-Rokutan
Route 61B for Nishi-Deto and Nagayoshi-Rokutan
Route 61C for Nagayoshi Shogakko-mae, Nagayoshi-Rokutan and Craft Park
Route 61D for Nishi-Deto, Craft Park and Nagayoshi-Rokutan
Route 9 for Hirano Kuyakusho-mae via Kami-minami and Hirano-Miyamachi Nichome
Bus stop 2
Route 1 for  via Hirano-Miyamachi Nichome
Route 2 for Nagayoshi-Nagahara-higashi Sanchome
Bus stop 3
Route 3 for  via Kire-higashiguchi and Subway Hirano
Route 73 for  via Hirano Sports Center and Subway Hirano
Bus stop 4
Route 4 for Subway Suminoekoen via Subway Kire-Uriwari and Subway Nagai
Route 14 for Koya-ohashi via Subway Kire-Uriwari
Bus stop 5
Route 16 for Uriwari-higashi Hatchome
Route 33 for Nagayoshi-Kawanabe Yonchome via Nagayoshi Koko-mae

External links

 Official Site 
 Official Site 

Hirano-ku, Osaka
Osaka Metro stations
Railway stations in Japan opened in 1980